Corona is a relatively long and difficult patience or card solitaire using two decks. The object of the game is to move all of the cards to the foundations.  Successfully winning the game is considered difficult.

Play is much like that in the popular family of games based on Napoleon at St Helena, but with a tableau of 12 piles instead of 10. Corona is nearly identical to the variant of Limited, with the exception of an additional restriction that the deck is used to refill empty piles rather than letting you fill them as desired.

Rules

Layout
Corona has eight foundations that build up in suit from Ace to King, e.g. Ace♥, 2♥, 3♥, 4♥...

There are twelve tableau piles that build down in suit, e.g.  10♦, 9♦, 8♦, 7♦...

Play
Only one card on can be moved at a time, and this is the top card on each tableau pile or the single card being dealt from the stock.  These cards can be played onto the foundations or onto other tableau piles.  

The stock is dealt one card at a time, and automatically fills empty spaces in the tableau piles.  Only one pass through the deck is allowed.  

The game is out once all cards have been moved to the foundations.

References
 Coops, Helen L.  100 Games of Solitaire
 Hapgood, George.  Solitaire and Patience (as "The Round Dozen")
 Parlett, David.  The Penguin Book of Patience

See also
 List of patiences and solitaires
 Glossary of patience and solitaire terms

Double-deck patience card games
Mobile games
Simple packers